WJON (1240 AM kHz) is a radio station in St. Cloud, Minnesota airing a News/Talk format. The station is owned by Townsquare Media. Its main competitors are Leighton Broadcasting's KNSI of St. Cloud and WCCO and KTLK of Minneapolis.
The station is also heard on FM translator W237EU 95.3 in St. Cloud.

The station's studios, along with Townsquare's other St. Cloud stations, are located at 640 Lincoln Avenue SE, on St. Cloud's east side.

External links
WJON official website

FCC History Cards for WJON

Radio stations in St. Cloud, Minnesota
News and talk radio stations in the United States
Townsquare Media radio stations
Radio stations established in 1950